The Derby de la Côte d'Azur is a football match contested between Ligue 1 clubs AS Monaco and OGC Nice. The name of the derby derives from the fact that Monaco and Nice are the two major clubs in France that are situated on or near the Côte d'Azur, known in English as the French Riviera. The derby may also refer to matches involving AS Cannes, however since the club's downfall into the amateur divisions, the derby has only been contested by Monaco and Nice.

Background
The rivalry between Monaco and Nice is a geographic one, first of all, the two cities being separated by only 20 kilometres. Furthermore, Nice and Monaco have competed many years together in Division 1, including nine years in-a-row from 2002 to 2011 and both are among the most important football clubs in France (Nice won 4 championships and 3 cups, while Monaco won 8 championships and 5 cups). The rivalry is intensified by Monaco being the dominant club in the direct meetings, having more money and being a more frequent presence in the European football.

However, the rivalry between these two clubs is not without passion and would sometimes even end up in violent clashes between fans of both teams.

Statistics
As of 26 February 2023.

References

External links
  Nice Official Site
  Monaco Official Site

French football derbies
AS Cannes
AS Monaco FC
OGC Nice
1953 establishments in Europe
Football in Provence-Alpes-Côte d'Azur
Recurring sporting events established in 1953